Domenico Mungo (born 18 January 1993) is an Italian football player. He plays for Italian  club Viterbese.

Club career
He is the product of Parma youth teams. He made his senior debut in Serie D in the 2012–12 season for Pro Piacenza.

Next season, he made his debut on the professional level in Lega Pro Seconda Divisione for Chieti on 2 September 2012 in a game against Pontedera.

After that season he returned to Parma, but never made an appearance for them, going on a string of Serie C loans for the next two seasons.

On 5 August 2016, he signed a two-year contract with Serie C club Cosenza. For 2018–19 Cosenza advanced to Serie B and Mungo re-signed with them for another season, making his second-tier debut soon thereafter.

On 5 August 2019, he signed a three-year contract with Teramo.

On 31 January 2022, Mungo moved to Viterbese.

References

External links
 

1993 births
Sportspeople from the Province of Reggio Emilia
Footballers from Emilia-Romagna
Living people
Italian footballers
Association football midfielders
A.S. Pro Piacenza 1919 players
S.S. Chieti Calcio players
A.C. Perugia Calcio players
F.C. Esperia Viareggio players
U.S. Pistoiese 1921 players
Cosenza Calcio players
S.S. Teramo Calcio players
U.S. Viterbese 1908 players
Serie B players
Serie C players
Serie D players